The Boeing B-47 Stratojet is an American jet-engine Strategic Bomber used by the United States Air Force from 1951 until 1977. Of the 2,032 aircraft built, 23 survive today, none of which are airworthy. All are located in the United States.

Surviving aircraft

References

B-47 Stratojet, List

Boeing
Boeing B-47 Stratojets